Ala Ghawas [Arabic: علاء غوّاص] (born 22 July 1981) is a Bahraini independent singer-songwriter, musician & record producer. Most of his discography was released in English.

Career

2007–2009: debut trilogy of EPs
Ghawas recorded and released his debut EP, "Hums", in 2007 during his time in Boston as a Fulbright Scholar. The release was received positively by the Bahraini media upon his return and then followed by another two critically acclaimed EPs, "Whispers" in 2008 and "Screams" in 2009.

After a series of performances in music festivals following his first three EPs, on 19 November 2009, Ghawas performed his first solo show at the prestigious concert hall of Shaikh Ebrahim Center in Muharraq. The recordings from the concert were released digitally later in 2011 on iTunes as a live album entitled "Live from Muharraq" and it contains live renditions from Hums, Whispers and Screams along with Elliott Smith's cover "Between the Bars" and Leonard Cohen's "Hallelujah".

2013–2015: "Armor" and partnership with Likwid
Starting 2011, Ghawas spent almost three years writing new songs for his debut LP, "Armor", and partnered with the Bahraini band, ‘Likwid’, for the recording of these songs. He also collaborated with Bahraini composer Mohammed Haddad for arranging live strings sections in 4 songs. The album was released in November 2013 and featured his most popular single to date, "Elsewhere". After the release of Armor, the partnership between Ala Ghawas and Likwid took more adventurous grounds with a series of live performances to promote the album in Bahrain, Dubai and Cairo.

Later in 2015, Ghawas invited Likwid to record and film a live concert and a documentary at his house and called it "Ala Ghawas & Likwid: Live from Allston". Ghawas named his house "Allston" honoring the small town in the city of Boston where he used to live in 2006 and 2007. The film was produced and directed by Bahraini filmmaker 'Saleh Nass'.

2017–2019: "Tryst" and "Live from Grace"
Ghawas' 5th studio album is entitled "Tryst" and it was released in November 2017. The album was written and produced by Ghawas himself and engineered by Abdulla Jamal for recording/mixing the album. Ghawas had also collaborated with Bahraini artist Abbas Almosawi to paint the cover artwork of the album.

In 2019, Ghawas filmed and recorded his third live album entitled "Live from Grace" and it featured performances from his friends and frequent collaborators Ahmed Alqasim, Fawaz Alshaikh, Ali Alqaseer, Abdulla Haji, Isa Najem, Eman Haddad and Hassan Haddad. The album contained 12 original renditions of songs written by Ala Ghawas from his previous studio releases.

2021–present: "Brouvat Mout" and return to Arabic
On 24 November 2021, Ghawas has released his 6th studio album and the first ever in Arabic, entitled "Brouvat Mout".

Discography

Studio albums
 2007 – Hums EP (English)
 2008 – Whispers EP (English)
 2009 – Screams EP (English)
 2013 – Armor (English)
 2017 – Tryst (English)
 2021 – Brouvat Mout (Arabic)

Live albums
 2011 – Live from Muharraq (English)
 2015 – Live from Allston (English)
 2019 – Live from Grace (English)

References

External links
Official website

1981 births
Living people
21st-century Bahraini male singers
Bahraini musicians
People from Muharraq